Zardkhaneh (also known as Zardeh Khāneh) is a village in Vargahan Rural District, in the Central District of Ahar County, East Azerbaijan Province, Iran. At the 2006 census, its total population was 125 persons amongst 26 families.

References 

Populated places in Ahar County